Events in the year 1762 in India.

Events
National income - ₹9,895 million
 Battle of Alegaon
 Battle of Amritsar (1762)

References

 
India
Years of the 18th century in India